Manuel Marburger (born May 7, 1973 in Bad Soden-Salmünster) is a German industrial climber.

Career 

Marburger worked as an engine driver for Deutsche Bahn AG and as a paramedic. He began his training as an industrial climber at the Fach- und Interessenverband für Seilunterstützte Arbeitstechniken (FISAT) and founded his first company, Kletter-Spezial-Einheit GmbH & Co. KG. For this company he was awarded the Hessian Founders Prize 2006.

In 2002,  Marburger founded a vocational climbing school in Bad Soden-Salmünster,  the first school in Germany for the training and further education of rope technicians and rope workers. Some time later he founded Blacksafe GmbH, a company specialising in products for professional industrial climbers. For this purpose he opened an online shop, the Kletter-Spezial-Laden. Marburger sold   Kletter-Spezial-Einheit GmbH & Co. KG in 2013, and  Blacksafe GmbH in 2019.

His current company, Muve GmbH, is dedicated to management consulting, team training, coaching and interim management. Marburger also works as a keynote speaker.

Recognition 

 2006: Hessian Founders Award for the Most Intelligent Business Idea
 2012: Industry Outdoor Award for the most innovative product development
 2019: Red Fox Award: Germany's Best Business Speaker

Publications 

 Marburger, Manuel. Aufschlagen und Einschlagen, Muve Verlag, May 1, 2017 
 Marburger, Manuel (editor). Erfolg geht anders: Top Speaker verraten, was wirklich zählt, Kindle Edition, e-book, March 13, 2019.

References

External links 

Official Website of Manuel Marburger

German company founders
1973 births
German-language writers
People from Main-Kinzig-Kreis
Living people